The 1995-96 Four Hills Tournament took place at the four traditional venues of Oberstdorf, Garmisch-Partenkirchen, Innsbruck and Bischofshofen, located in Germany and Austria, between 30 December 1995 and 6 January 1996.

Results

Overall

References

External links 
 Official website 

Four Hills Tournament
Four Hills Tournament 
Four Hills Tournament 
Four Hills Tournament 
Four Hills Tournament 
Four Hills Tournament 
Four Hills Tournament 
Four Hills Tournament 
Four Hills Tournament 
Four Hills Tournament 
1990s in Innsbruck